Baishevo (Bayış) is a rural locality (a village) and the administrative centre of Baishevsky Selsoviet, Zianchurinsky District, Bashkortostan, Russia. The population was 431 as of 2010. There are 9 streets.

Geography 
Baishevo is located 92 km southeast of Isyangulovo (the district's administrative centre) by road. Sagitovo is the nearest rural locality.

References 

Rural localities in Zianchurinsky District